After Truth: Disinformation and the Cost of Fake News is a 2020 documentary television film directed by Andrew Rossi and executive produced by Brian Stelter. The film premiered on HBO on March 19, 2020.

Summary
The film surveys the effects of disinformation campaigns occurring on social media and the impacts of well known conspiracy theories from Obama birther theories and Jade Helm, to Seth Rich, to Pizzagate, as well as some of the major and minor personalities involved. "Disinformation" is the intentional dissemination of falsehoods. The documentary shows that although the elements of fake news are not new, modern fake news is enhanced and amplified by information technology. The roots of fake news are distrust and exploitation. "Inevitably, [the film] confronts the question of what we should do about fake news." It also shows the background of two conspiracy theorists to create and promote a conspiracy theory regarding Robert Mueller in order to smear him while serving as special counsel.

The film's main theme is framed by "dash-cam footage of Edgar Maddison Welch" as he drove with a high powered gun from North Carolina to Comet Ping Pong pizzeria in Washington, D.C. with intent to stop what he delusively believed to be a "child sex slave ring". The film shows the Pizzagate conspiracy growing on Reddit and 4chan, how it was fomented by the alt-right and Alex Jones, which then translated into a real-life dangerous situation that occurred beyond the internet.

Reception

References

Further reading

Social Media and Fake News in the 2016 Election. by researchers at New York University and Stanford University. April 2017. Free PDF download.

External links
 
 
 
 

2020 television films
2020 documentary films
Films about disinformation
Fake news
Documentary films about conspiracy theories
Films directed by Andrew Rossi
HBO documentary films
Skepticism
2020 films
2020s English-language films
2020s American films